ping is a computer network administration software utility used to test the reachability of a host on an Internet Protocol (IP) network. It is available for virtually all operating systems that have networking capability, including most embedded network administration software.

Ping measures the round-trip time for messages sent from the originating host to a destination computer that are echoed back to the source. The name comes from active sonar terminology that sends a pulse of sound and listens for the echo to detect objects under water.

Ping operates by means of Internet Control Message Protocol (ICMP) packets. Pinging involves sending an ICMP echo request to the target host and waiting for an ICMP echo reply. The program reports errors, packet loss, and a statistical summary of the results, typically including the minimum, maximum, the mean round-trip times, and standard deviation of the mean.

The command-line options of the ping utility and its output vary between the numerous implementations. Options may include the size of the payload, count of tests, limits for the number of network hops (TTL) that probes traverse, interval between the requests and time to wait for a response. Many systems provide a companion utility ping6, for testing on Internet Protocol version 6 (IPv6) networks, which implement ICMPv6.

History

The ping utility was written by Mike Muuss in December 1983 during his employment at the Ballistic Research Laboratory, now the US Army Research Laboratory. A remark by David Mills on using ICMP echo packets for IP network diagnosis and measurements prompted Muuss to create the utility to troubleshoot network problems. The author named it after the sound that sonar makes, since its methodology is analogous to sonar's echolocation. The backronym Packet InterNet Groper for PING has been used for over 30 years, and although Muuss says that from his point of view PING was not intended as an acronym, he has acknowledged Mills' expansion of the name. The first released version was public domain software; all subsequent versions have been licensed under the BSD license. Ping was first included in 4.3BSD. The FreeDOS version was developed by Erick Engelke and is licensed under the GPL. Tim Crawford developed the ReactOS version. It is licensed under the MIT License.

RFC 1122 prescribes that any host must process ICMP echo requests and issue echo replies in return.

Invocation example
The following is the output of running ping on Linux for sending five probes (1-second interval by default, configurable via -i option) to the target host www.example.com:

$ ping -c 5 www.example.com

PING www.example.com (93.184.216.34): 56 data bytes
64 bytes from 93.184.216.34: icmp_seq=0 ttl=56 time=11.632 ms
64 bytes from 93.184.216.34: icmp_seq=1 ttl=56 time=11.726 ms
64 bytes from 93.184.216.34: icmp_seq=2 ttl=56 time=10.683 ms
64 bytes from 93.184.216.34: icmp_seq=3 ttl=56 time=9.674 ms
64 bytes from 93.184.216.34: icmp_seq=4 ttl=56 time=11.127 ms

--- www.example.com ping statistics ---
5 packets transmitted, 5 packets received, 0.0% packet loss
round-trip min/avg/max/stddev = 9.674/10.968/11.726/0.748 ms

The output lists each probe message and the results obtained. Finally, it lists the statistics of the entire test. In this example, the shortest round trip time was 9.674 ms, the average was 10.968 ms, and the maximum value was 11.726 ms. The measurement had a standard deviation of 0.748 ms.

Error indications
In cases of no response from the target host, most implementations display either nothing or periodically print notifications about timing out. Possible ping results indicating a problem include the following:
   or  host, network or protocol unreachable
  source route failed
  fragmentation needed
  or  destination network/host unknown
  source host is isolated
  communication with destination network administratively prohibited
  communication with destination host administratively prohibited
  for this ToS the destination network is unreachable
  for this ToS the destination host is unreachable
  communication administratively prohibited
  host precedence violation
  precedence cutoff in effect

In case of error, the target host or an intermediate router sends back an ICMP error message, for example host unreachable or TTL exceeded in transit.  In addition, these messages include the first eight bytes of the original message (in this case header of the ICMP echo request, including the quench value), so the ping utility can match responses to originating queries.

Message format

ICMP packet

Generic composition of an ICMP packet:
 IPv4 Header (in blue): protocol set to 1 (ICMP) and Type of Service set to 0.
 IPv6 Header (in blue): Next Header set to 58 (ICMP6) 
 ICMP Header (in red):
 Type of ICMP message (8 bits)
 Code (8 bits)
 Checksum (16 bits), the 16-bit one's complement of the one's complement sum of the packet. For IPv4, this is calculated from the ICMP message starting with the Type field (the IP header is not included). For IPv6 this is calculated from the ICMP message, prepended with an IPv6 pseudo-header.
 Header Data (32 bits) field, which in this case (ICMP echo request and replies), will be composed of an identifier (16 bits) and sequence number (16 bits).
 ICMP Payload: payload for the different kind of answers; can be an arbitrary length, left to implementation detail.  However, the packet including IP and ICMP headers must be less than the maximum transmission unit of the network or risk being fragmented.

Echo request
The echo request (ping) is an ICMP/ICMP6 message.

The Identifier and Sequence Number can be used by the client to match the reply with the request that caused the reply. In practice, most Linux systems use a unique identifier for every ping process, and sequence number is an increasing number within that process. Windows uses a fixed identifier, which varies between Windows versions, and a sequence number that is only reset at boot time.

Echo reply
The echo reply is an ICMP message generated in response to an echo request; it is mandatory for all hosts and must include the exact payload received in the request.

 The identifier and sequence number can be used by the client to associate each echo request with its reply.

Payload
The payload of the packet is generally filled with ASCII characters, as the output of the tcpdump utility shows in the last 32 bytes of the following example (after the eight-byte ICMP header starting with ):
16:24:47.966461 IP (tos 0x0, ttl 128, id 15103, offset 0, flags [none],
proto: ICMP (1), length: 60) 192.168.146.22 > 192.168.144.5: ICMP echo request,
id 1, seq 38, length 40
       0x0000:  4500 003c 3aff 0000 8001 5c55 c0a8 9216  E..<:.....\U....
       0x0010:  c0a8 9005 0800 4d35 0001 0026 6162 6364  ......M5...&abcd
       0x0020:  6566 6768 696a 6b6c 6d6e 6f70 7172 7374  efghijklmnopqrst
       0x0030:  7576 7761 6263 6465 6667 6869            uvwabcdefghi
The payload may include a timestamp indicating the time of transmission and a sequence number, which are not found in this example. This allows ping to compute the round trip time in a stateless manner without needing to record the time of transmission of each packet.

The payload may also include a magic packet for the Wake-on-LAN protocol, but the minimum payload, in that case, is longer than shown. The Echo Request typically does not receive any reply if the host was sleeping in hibernation state, but the host still wakes up from sleep state if its interface is configured to accept wakeup requests. If the host is already active and configured to allow replies to incoming ICMP Echo Request packets, the returned reply should include the same payload. This may be used to detect that the remote host was effectively woken up, by repeating a new request after some delay to allow the host to resume its network services. If the host was just sleeping in low power active state, a single request wakes up that host just enough to allow its Echo Reply service to reply instantly if that service was enabled. The host does not need to wake up all devices completely and may return to low-power mode after a short delay. Such configuration may be used to avoid a host to enter in hibernation state, with much longer wake-up delay, after some time passed in low power active mode.

Security loopholes

To conduct a denial-of-service attack, an attacker may send ping requests as fast as possible, possibly overwhelming the victim with ICMP echo requests. This technique is called a ping flood.

Ping requests to multiple addresses, ping sweeps, may be used to obtain a list of all hosts on a network.

See also

 fping
 hping
 Keepalive
 nping
 PathPing
 Ping of death
 Ping-pong scheme
 Smurf attack
 Traceroute

References

Further reading

External links

 
  
 
 ping | Microsoft Docs
 

Free network management software
Internet Protocol based network software
Network analyzers
OS/2 commands
Unix network-related software
Windows administration
Windows communication and services